The Air Force Falcons men's soccer program represents the United States Air Force Academy in all NCAA Division I men's college soccer competitions. Founded in 1956, the Falcons compete as associate members in the Western Athletic Conference. They are coached by Doug Hill and Assistant Coach Chris Foster. Air Force plays their home matches at Cadet Soccer Stadium.

NCAA Tournament history 

The team has qualified for 14 NCAA Tournaments. Their best performances came in 1968 and 1993, where they reached the quarterfinals.

Coaching history 
Air Force has had 11 coaches in their program's existence.

Stadium 
Air Force play their home games at Cadet Soccer Stadium.  They have played select matches at Cadet Lacrosse Stadium.

References

External links 
 

 
1956 establishments in Colorado
Association football clubs established in 1956
Military soccer clubs in the United States